Diana Hinko (born 30 November 1943) is an Austrian former pair skater. Competing with Heinz Döpfl, she became a three-time national champion (1959–1961). The pair finished eighth at the 1960 Winter Olympics and fifth at the 1961 European Championships.

After their partnership ended, Hinko teamed with Bernd Henhapel (or Bernhard Henhappel) and won the 1962 Austrian national title.

Results

Pairs with Döpfl

Pairs with Henhapel

References

Navigation

Austrian female pair skaters
Olympic figure skaters of Austria
Figure skaters at the 1960 Winter Olympics
1943 births
Living people